{{Infobox person
| name   = William Wasswa
| image =
| image_size     = 
| caption  = 
| birth_date  =  
| birth_place = Mulago Hospital, Uganda
| death_date  = 
| death_place = 
| alma_mater         = Mbarara University,,University of Cape Town| occupation                = lecturer, physician,  researcher, academic administrator 
| years_active              = 2004— present
| nationality               = Ugandan
| citizenship               = Uganda
| known_for                 = Lecturer, researcher, academic administration
| networth                  = 
| title                     = Head of Department  Biomedical Sciences and Engineering at Mbarara University
}}William Wasswa''' is a Ugandan  lecturer, engineer and researcher. He serves as a senior lecturer in the Department of Biomedical Sciences and Engineering at Mbarara University of Science and Technology in Uganda.

Background
He was born at Mulago Hospital, in Kampala, Uganda's capital city, in 1988.

Education
Wasswa  holds a bachelor's degree in Computer Engineering from Mbarara University, a master's degree in Biomedical Engineering from University of Cape Town and a PhD in Biomedical Engineering from Mbarara University.  His PhD research was on the application of A1 for Cervical Cancer diagnosis. He is an AfyaBora Global Health Leader Postdoctoral Fellow.

Work experience 
He is the CEO of Global Auto Systems Ltd Uganda, a startup revolutionizing service delivery with use of AI, Data analytics, Block chain and Robotics. and cloud Computing technologies to improve patient outcomes while reducing the total cost of care. He works on a digital platform called Papsi A1 for automated diagnosis and management of cervical cancer in low and middle income countries. Currently he is the head of the Department of Biomedical sciences and Engineering at Mbarara University of Science and Technology.

Other Considerations
In 2020, he was amongst the shortlisted candidates for the UK Royal Academy of Engineering Africa Prize for Innovation 2020 where he won a grant of $13000. He has expertise knowledge in Artificial Intelligence, Medical Imaging and Robotics. He is a technical member of the expert panel on drafting the AU High level on Artificial Intelligence for Africa by AUDA-NEPAD and also a member of the ITU-WHO Focus Group on Artificial Intelligence for Health. He was among the WHO Top Africa Innovations at second WHO Africa Health Forum which took place in Cape Verde (2019) and he showcased in African Innovation at Commonwealth Health Ministers meeting in Geneva Switzerland 2019. He is a member of Mbarara University Quality Assurance Committee and Research Ethics Committee and also leads the Biomedical Engineering student’s community engagement program in the department of Biomedical Sciences and Engineering.

Research
He has  published the finding of his research on Artificial Intelligence, Medical Imaging, Microfluidics, Cancer genesis diagnosis and treatment, Biomechanics, in medical journals and other peer publications hence cited with an H-Index of 9 with 487 citations in over 9 peer-reviewed journal in scientific publications.

Selected publications

Conferences 
Wasswa has attended several conferences such as;
Next Einstein Forum
Commonwealth Health Ministers Meeting in Geneva, Switzerland, 19 May 2019. 
Expert Consultations on Artificial Intelligence Workshop in Johannesburg, South Africa from May 29–31, 2019.
Second WHO Africa Health Forum 26–28 March 2019, Praia, Cabo Verde. 
IST-Africa 2019 Conference, Laico Regency Hotel, Nairobi, 08 - 10 May 2019. 
IST-Africa 2018 Conference, Gaborone International Conference Centre, Botswana, 09 - 11 May 2018.
Innovations Tech Summit for Africa, May 2019, Mbarara Uganda. Technical program committee member.  
The 6th East African Healthcare Engineering Regional Conference and Exhibition (EARC 2018) 28–29 November 2018 Kampala, Uganda.
Health Innovations Conference, 19–20 March 2019, Kampala Serena Hotel. 
15th International Congress on American Pathology & Oncology Research (2018). 
National Cancer Research Institute, UK. Partners in Cancer Research Conference Glasgow, 2018.

Awards
In 2020, he was among the   finalists of the UK Royal Academy of Engineering Africa Prize for Engineering Innovation

References

External links
Dr.Wasswa William – Faculty of Applied Sciences and Technology
William Wasswa – Global Gathering 2020
Meet the Ugandan entrepreneur who is bringing AI to the COVID-19 fight
2020 - Royal Academy of Engineering
Africa Prize for Engineering Innovation 2020 shortlist announced
2019 Africa Prize for Engineering Innovation

Living people
1990 births
Mbarara University alumni
Ugandan bioengineers
People from Wakiso District
People from Central Region, Uganda